Frank Craven (August 24, 1875September 1, 1945) was an American stage and film actor, playwright, and screenwriter, best known for originating the role of the Stage Manager in Thornton Wilder's Our Town.

Early years
Craven's parents, John T. Craven and Ella Mayer Craven, were actors, and he first appeared on stage when he was three years old, in a child's part in The Silver King, in which his father was acting. His next appearance on stage occurred 13 years later in another production of the same play. That experience stirred an interest in acting as a career.

Career

Before he acted in films, Craven worked in stage productions, not limiting his activity to acting. "I would do anything around the place," he said. He found later that work with carpentry, painting, and other backstage activities proved "invaluable" to him. His initial success in New York came in the role of James Gilley in Bought and Paid For (1911). He also played the same role in a production in London.  He also was a playwright, penning hits such as Too Many Cooks (1914) and The First Year (1920).

Craven was a character actor who often portrayed wry, small-town figures. His first film role was in We Americans (1928), and he appeared in State Fair (1933), Penrod and Sam (1937), Jack London (1943), and Son of Dracula (1943), among many others. He wrote numerous screenplays, most notably for the Laurel and Hardy film Sons of the Desert (1933). His IMDB biography credits him with sixteen writing credits and two directing credits.

In 1938, Craven played the Stage Manager in Our Town on Broadway, and reprised the role in the 1940 film version of the play. His son John Craven starred as George Gibbs in the stage version, a role played by William Holden in the 1940 film.

Craven died in 1945, shortly after finishing his work in Colonel Effingham's Raid.

Craven was a Republican who campaigned for Thomas Dewey in the 1944 United States presidential election.

Filmography

References

External links

1875 births
1945 deaths
American male film actors
American male stage actors
American male screenwriters
20th-century American male actors
Male actors from Boston
Burials at Kensico Cemetery
California Republicans
Massachusetts Republicans
New York (state) Republicans
Screenwriters from Massachusetts
Broadway theatre directors
20th-century American male writers
20th-century American screenwriters